Fort Lauderdale Strikers may refer to:

Fort Lauderdale Strikers (1977–1983), member of North American Soccer League from 1977 to 1983
Fort Lauderdale Strikers (1988–1994), member of American Soccer League from 1988 to 1989 and American Professional Soccer League from 1990 to 1994
Florida Strikers, member of USISL from 1994 to 1997, known as Fort Lauderdale Strikers for the 1995 season
Fort Lauderdale Strikers (2006–2016), member of USL First Division from 2006 to 2009 and North American Soccer League from 2011 to 2016.